The 1977 Alabama Crimson Tide football team (variously "Alabama", "UA" or "Bama") represented the University of Alabama in the 1977 NCAA Division I football season. It was the Crimson Tide's 83rd overall and 44th season as a member of the Southeastern Conference (SEC). The team was led by head coach Bear Bryant, in his 20th year, and played their home games at Bryant–Denny Stadium in Tuscaloosa and Legion Field in Birmingham, Alabama. They finished season with eleven wins and one loss (11–1 overall, 7–0 in the SEC), as SEC champions and with a victory over Ohio State in the Sugar Bowl.

Schedule

Personnel

Game summaries

Ole Miss

at Nebraska

Alabama went into Lincoln with Nebraska still feeling the sting of a home loss to Washington State.  While the Crimson Tide slightly exceeded the Cornhuskers in offensive production, five interceptions helped give Nebraska the edge to pull off the stunning upset.

at Vanderbilt

Georgia

at USC

Tennessee

Louisville

at Mississippi State

at LSU

Miami (FL)

vs. Auburn

Jeff Rutledge 15 rushes, 102 yards

Sugar Bowl (vs. Ohio State)

References
General

 
 

Specific

Alabama
Alabama Crimson Tide football seasons
Southeastern Conference football champion seasons
Sugar Bowl champion seasons
Alabama Crimson Tide football